Ian Bruce Turpie (6 November 1943 – 11 March 2012), sometimes referred to as Turps, was an Australian performer, actor (theatre, television, film), pop singer and presenter (television, radio). He was the host of the teen pop music TV show, The Go!! Show (1965–66) and various TV game shows, The Price Is Right (1981–1985, 1989), and Supermarket Sweep (1992–1994). As a TV actor he portrayed Keith Warne on Swift and Shift Couriers (2008, 2011) and Wazza and Narrator in Housos (2011). He was diagnosed with oesophageal cancer in 2011 and died in the following year, aged 68.

Career

Early life

Ian Bruce Turpie was born on 6 November 1943 at Ferntree Gully's Bush Nursing Hospital to Don Turpie (1911–1990), a shipping clerk and Joyce ( Olson, 1917–1999) and grew up with six siblings. He attended nearby Boronia State School, where he performed gymnastics and school plays. His first starring role, in a school play, was as the titular character in Toad of Toad Hall, at the local Progress Hall, in August 1954. He began his entertainment career at the age of 10, when he was accepted at the Hector Crawford Drama School. For secondary education he attended a technical high school.

Turpie also gained recognition as a juvenile actor working in radio. He appeared in radio programmes alongside Robert Helpmann and June Bronhill, and in the Crawford radio series, D24, which was recorded at the 3DB studios in Melbourne and broadcast nationally over the Major Broadcasting Network.

During his teens, Turpie began his music career and focused on playing guitar, songwriting and singing. By the age of 16, he was a seasoned radio and stage performer, touring Australia in Peter Pan (1957), Auntie Mame (1959) and Bye Bye Birdie (1961), and appearing in several National Theatre productions including Shakespeare's Macbeth.

Television 

Turpie played a radical student, who is shot dead in a bank robbery, in the opening scene of the debut episode of Crawford Productions' police procedural TV series, Homicide (October 1964). He had made his TV debut in May of that year in a guest role in the episode, "Queen Versus Wilson" of the courtroom drama Consider Your Verdict.

Turpie performed on Bandstand, Time for Terry and The Graham Kennedy Show during the early 1960s. He replaced Johnny O'Keefe for a stint as national host on TV pop music show, Sing, Sing, Sing. He was an early boyfriend of Olivia Newton-John, with whom he appeared in a 1965 Australian musical telemovie, Funny Things Happen Down Under, which was Newton-John's debut performance. He was chosen to host the teenage variety show The Go!! Show from mid-1965 until the end of 1966.

In the 1970s, Turpie moved to Sydney to work the club circuit, and he continued to make guest appearances on numerous television shows, including The Mike Walsh Show, The Bert Newton Show, A Guy Called Athol, and the ABC variety series Follies. In the following decade, Turpie became a nationwide figure as host of the game show The New Price Is Right (1981–1985, 1989). This was followed by two other game shows, Press Your Luck (1987–1988) and Supermarket Sweep (1992–1994).

Turpie developed cult status following a four-year stint as Club President on Roy & HG's Club Buggery (1995–1997) and its sequel, The Channel Nine Show (1998). Known as the Giant of the G Chord, he performed renditions of Nirvana's "Smells Like Teen Spirit", and, complete with suspenders, The Rocky Horror Picture Show's "Time Warp". Less serious Club Buggery appearances in sketches, "Turps About the House", "Captain Ajax" and "Sam Stain", showcased his comedic talents, as did a semi-regular role as cabaret-style singer Rolan Fields in drama series Always Greener (2001–03). From 2000 he acted in the TV comedy series Pizza and had a lead role in Housos (2011) as Wazza Jones, who was also the program's narrator. He portrayed depot manager Keith Warne in Swift & Shift Couriers seasons one (2008) and two (2011).

Personal life 

Ian Turpie was the boyfriend of Olivia Newton-John for about five years from his nineteenth birthday. He provided guitar when Newton-John auditioned for Johnny O'Keefe's Sing, Sing, Sings talent quest in September 1964, which she won. Newton-John returned to England in 1966. They agreed not to date others unless they had been separated for more than three months; Newton-John remained in England for longer. By the time Newton-John briefly returned from England for a visit, Turpie was dating his future wife, Jan. Turpie married Jan Hamilton, a model, in 1968, and the couple had three children. Due to Turpie's career, the family relocated to Sydney in 1974.

In 2004, the Australian Competition & Consumer Commission (ACCC) took legal action against Turpie for misleading and deceptive conduct in breach of the Trade Practices Act. The ACCC alleged that Turpie had made false claims (that he was losing his sexual potency) in advertisements for an erectile dysfunction treatment spray from the Australian Medical Institute.

In 2005, Turpie pleaded guilty to drink driving after driving in Manly, New South Wales, with a blood alcohol level of 0.08 (the legal limit in the state is 0.05). He was fined $867 and had his driver's licence suspended for six months; however, this was overturned on appeal. After taking into account Turpie's charity work and his need to drive to work, Judge Reg Blanch ordered that no conviction be recorded. Turpie told reporters he was sorry for doing a "stupid thing".

Death 

On 18 February 2011, it was announced that Turpie, a heavy smoker, had been diagnosed with oesophageal cancer. He died on 11 March 2012, aged 68. When The Price is Right debuted its reboot in 2012, host Larry Emdur dedicated the first episode in memory of Turpie.

Discography

Albums

Awards and nominations

Penguin Award, Best Light Entertainment, The New Price Is Right (1985)
Logie Award, Most Popular Western Australia Show, Turpie Tonight (1983)
Penguin Award, Best Light Entertainment, The New Price Is Right (1982)

ARIA Music Awards

The ARIA Music Awards are a set of annual ceremonies presented by Australian Recording Industry Association (ARIA), which recognise excellence, innovation, and achievement across all genres of the music of Australia. They commenced in 1987. 

! 
|-
| 1997 || Talk of the Town || ARIA Award for Best Comedy Release ||  || 
|-

Mo Awards

The Australian Entertainment Mo Awards (commonly known informally as the Mo Awards), were annual Australian entertainment industry awards. They recognise achievements in live entertainment in Australia from 1975 to 2016. Ian Turpie won one award in that time. 
 (wins only)
|-
| 2010
| Ian Turpie
| Hall of Fame
| 
|-

Filmography

Funny Things Happen Down Under, as Lennie (1965)
Heaven's Burning, cameo as used car salesman (1997)
All the Way (1998)
Somewhere in the Darkness, as the Weatherman (1998)
Kissing Kimberley Cooper (Tropfest film)

TV

Acting

Consider Your Verdict (1964) 1 episode
Homicide (1964) 1 episode
The Magic Boomerang (1965) 1 episode
Pizza as Ian Clinton (2000)  season 1 episode 4
Always Greener as Rolan Fields (2002–2003) 6 episodes
Swift and Shift Couriers as Keith Warne (2008, 2011) 19 episodes
Double the Fist as M.C (2008) 1 episode
Housos as Wazza (2011)

Host regular

Club Buggery, ABC (1996-1997)
The Go!! Show
Sing, Sing, Sing (replacing Johnny O'Keefe)
Surprise, Surprise - co-host with Tommy Hanlon Jr
Supermarket Sweep, Nine Network (1992-1994)
Time for Terry co-host with Terry O'Neill
Turpie Tonight
The Newlyweds Game, Network Ten (1968), Nine Network (1987)
The New Price Is Right (1981–1986)
The Price Is Right (1989)
Press Your Luck, Seven Network (1987–1988)

Guest appearances

The Young Entertainers
This is your Life (with Mike Munro)
Love is in the Air
Long Way to the Top
All the Way
Theatre Royal
Revue 7
TeenTime
Kommotion
Bandstand (Brian Henderson)
Steve Vizard Tonight
Bert Newton Show
Blankety Blanks (Graham Kennedy)
Family Feud (Rob Brough)
The Fat (Tony Squires)
Mike Walsh Show
Don Lane Show
Hey Hey It's Saturday (Daryl Somers)
Celebrity Who Wants to be a Millionaire?
Celebrity Wheel of Fortune
Penthouse Club (Mary Hardy)
Bandstand
A Guy Called Athol
ABC Follies
The Melbourne Show
Supermarket Sweep
Spicks and Specks
We'll Call You

Theatre

Credits:
Peter Pan (December 1957) – Princess Theatre, Melbourne
Nude with Violin (1958) – Comedy Theatre, Melbourne with Robert Helpmann,
Auntie Mame (February 1959) – Princess Theatre, Melbourne; (July) – Theatre Royal, Adelaide with Shirl Conway
Macbeth, National Theatre
Bye Bye Birdie (July 1961) – Theatre Royal, Adelaide; (August) – His Majesty's Theatre, Perth; (September) – Her Majesty's Theatre, Brisbane; (October) – Her Majesty's Theatre, Melbourne
Bubble & Squeak (February 1968) – Triaca's Theatre, Melbourne with Noel Ferrier producing, Jill Perryman acting
Hero (May 1976) – Seymour Centre, Chippendale with Graham Bond
Jesus Christ Superstar (April 1978) – St George Leagues Club, Kogarah with Marcia Hines (Mary), John English (Judas)

Radio

appeared in some episodes of the Crawford Productions' D24, broadcast nationally on the Major Broadcasting Network
ABC Play "Five Find Outers"
Evening Host 2CH

Charity work

Turpie was involved with the following charities: Australia Day ambassador (since 1995), Make a Wish Foundation, Merry Makers, Sunnyfield Association, Meningococcal Association, Children with Cancer, Lifeforce, Sydney Children's Hospital (Celebrity Golf Days), Alzheimer's Australia NSW and Rotary Club.

References

External links
Ian Turpie official website

"Olivia Newton-John" interviewed for Enough Rope (October 2004). Refers to romance with Ian Turpie.

1943 births
2012 deaths
Australian people of Scottish descent
Australian male film actors
Australian male stage actors
Australian male television actors
The Price Is Right
Australian game show hosts
Deaths from cancer in New South Wales
Television personalities from Melbourne